Calhoun County School District may refer to
 Calhoun County School District (Alabama)
 Calhoun County School District (Florida)
 Calhoun County School District (Georgia)
 Calhoun County School District (Mississippi)